Budrino is a rural locality (a village) in Yudinskoye Rural Settlement, Velikoustyugsky District, Vologda Oblast, Russia. The population was 74 as of 2002.

Geography 
Budrino is located 13 km northwest of Veliky Ustyug (the district's administrative centre) by road. Kulnevo is the nearest rural locality.

References 

Rural localities in Velikoustyugsky District